This is a list of the top-selling albums in New Zealand for 2012 from the Official New Zealand Music Chart's end-of-year chart, compiled by Recorded Music NZ.

Chart 

Key
 – Album of New Zealand origin

References

External links 

 The Official NZ Music Chart - albums

2012 in New Zealand music
2012 record charts
Albums 2012